Roko Mišlov (born 26 May 1988) is a Croatian football player who plays for WSC Hertha Wels.

Club career
He made his Croatian First Football League debut for HNK Šibenik on 21 March 2012 in a game against NK Lokomotiva. He has been playing in Austria since 2013, except for a season in Poland.

References

External links
 

1988 births
Living people
Sportspeople from Zadar
Association football midfielders
Croatian footballers
NK Zadar players
HNK Primorac Biograd na Moru players
HNK Šibenik players
TSV Hartberg players
SKN St. Pölten players
Miedź Legnica players
SV Horn players
Croatian Football League players
First Football League (Croatia) players
Austrian Football Bundesliga players
2. Liga (Austria) players
Austrian Regionalliga players
I liga players
Croatian expatriate footballers
Expatriate footballers in Austria
Croatian expatriate sportspeople in Austria
Expatriate footballers in Poland
Croatian expatriate sportspeople in Poland